Tmesipteris truncata is a fern ally endemic to eastern Australia. The habitat of this primitive plant is under waterfalls, or in sandstone gullies or rainforests. Commonly referred to as a Fork Fern. It is often found growing on the base of the King Fern. Usually seen as an epiphyte or lithophyte, but it may also appear as a terrestrial plant. Found as far south as Mount Dromedary.

The stems are 15 to 30 cm long, mostly unbranched. Three or four grooves are at the base. The leaves grow shorter at the base, also shorter at the apex of the stems. Leaves are narrow linear to oblong in shape; 15 to 25 mm long, 2 to 5 mm wide. The midvein of the leaf ends in a thin point. Synangia are 3 to 5 mm long.

The specific epithet truncata refers to the leaf tops, which appear abruptly cut off. This plant first appeared in scientific literature in 1810 as Psilotum truncatum in the Prodromus Florae Novae Hollandiae, authored by the prolific Scottish botanist, Robert Brown.

References

Psilotaceae
Flora of New South Wales
Flora of Queensland
Epiphytes
Plants described in 1810